Lido (Serbian Cyrillic: Лидо) is a non-residential urban neighborhood of Belgrade, the capital of Serbia. It is located in Belgrade's municipality of Zemun.

Location 

Lido is located on the northern tip of the Great War Island, on the Danube. It is actually a small, pointed sandy beach without permanent residents, which covers just small fragment of the island, as the entire Great War Island is protected by the law and urbanization is not allowed.

Characteristics 

It was named after the Lido in Venice and developed as a wild beach, as an alternative to the much popular and official beach and park of Ada Ciganlija. Despite being very popular among the inhabitants of Zemun, it never managed to come close to Ada Ciganlija's popularity. The beach is small, unattended and without almost any accommodations, except for several restaurants. It was accessible only by boats until the early 2000s when a pontoon bridge was laid every summer by the Yugoslav army. The organization of "Eho festival" on the island in early 2003 went disastrously because of the bad weather and the financial malversations of the organizers.

Already neglected Lido suffered the worst fate in 2006, during the disastrous floods. What little of infrastructure existed there was all washed away by the Danube. The beach was not returned to its previous state, pontoon bridge was not laid that year and only two boats remained to transport people to the island. As a result of all that, instead of 10,000 people which daily visited Lido in previous years, in 2006 there were no more than 200–300. For the summer 2007 Lido was finally prepared for visitors and the bridge is laid again. Further improvements preceded the 2008 season. Bank area and the green belt surrounding Lido were cleaned and arranged and for the first time lifeguard service was set on the beach, so as a police patrol and a boat ambulance. Instead of bridge, only boat access was organised, from both Zemun and Dorćol (central Belgrade) sides.

During the low water level in the Danube in the summer of 2022, the beach temporarily grew by the August for additional  of exposed riverbed. The drought also affected the depth of the water at the beach, as the only knee-deep water stretched for over  into the river's stream.

Gallery

References 

Neighborhoods of Belgrade
Beaches of Serbia